Duchess of Roxburghe is a title given to the wife of the Duke of Roxburghe. Women who have held the title include:

Susanna Innes-Ker, Duchess of Roxburghe (née Dalbiac; 1814–1895) (wife of the 6th Duke)
Anne Innes-Ker, Duchess of Roxburghe (née Spencer-Churchill; 1854–1923) (wife of the 7th Duke)
Mary Goelet (1878-1937) (wife of the 8th Duke)
Mary Innes-Ker, Duchess of Roxburghe (née Crewe-Milnes; 1915–2014) (1st wife of the 9th Duke}
Margaret Innes-Ker, Duchess of Roxburghe (née McConnel; 1918–1983) (2nd wife of the 9th Duke)